Map of places in Powys compiled from this list
See the list of places in Wales for places in other principal areas.

This is a list of towns and villages in the principal area of Powys, Wales.

 

A
Abercynafon
Aberhafesp
Aberhosan
Aberllynfi
Adfa

B
Berriew (Aberriw)
Bettws Cedewain (Betws Cedewain)
Bont Dolgadfan
Boughrood (Bochrwd)
Brecon (Aberhonddu)
Builth Wells (Llanfair ym Muallt)
Bwlch

C
Caersws
Capel-y-ffin
Carno
Cefn Coch
Cilmeri
City
Clyro
Commins Coch
Crickhowell
Crossgates
Cwmdu

D
Dolfach
Dylife

E
Elan Village
Erwood
Esgairgeiliog

F
Four Crosses, Llanfair Caereinion
Four Crosses near Oswestry
Fron, Llandrindod Wells
Fron, Montgomery
Fron, Welshpool

G
Garth
Glasbury
Glyntawe
Guilsfield

H
Hay-on-Wye
Howey
Hyssington
Honddu Isaf

I

J

K
Kerry
Knighton

L
Little London
Llan
Llanbrynmair
Llandinam
Llandrindod Wells
Llandysilio
Llandyssil
Llanfair Caereinion
Llanfechain
Llanfyllin
Llangammarch Wells
Llangurig
Llangynidr
Llanidloes
Llanigon
Llanrhaeadr-ym-Mochnant
Llansantffraid-ym-Mechain
Llanwrtyd Wells
Llanymynech
Llowes
Llyswen

M
Machynlleth
Manafon
Middletown
Milford
Montgomery

N
Newbridge-on-Wye (Pontnewydd ar Wy)
New Mills, Powys. 
New Radnor
Newtown (Y Drenewydd)

O
Old Radnor

P
Pandy
Penegoes
Pennant Melangell
Penpont
Penstrowed
Penybont
Pipton
Pontdolgoch
Presteigne (Llandandras)

Q

R
Rhayader

S
Sarn
Sennybridge
Staylittle

T
Talerddig
Talgarth
Talybont-on-Usk
Tirabad
Trecastle
Trefeglwys

U

V

W
Walton
Welshpool (Y Trallwng)

X

Y
Ystradfellte
Ystradgynlais

Z

See also
List of places in Powys (categorised)
List of places in Wales

 
Powys